Nizhal may refer to:
 Nizhal (film), a 2021 Indian Malayalam-language mystery thriller film
 Nizhal (TV series), an Indian Tamil-language soap opera